Timothy Landers (1 November 1910 – 26 May 1991) was an Irish Gaelic footballer. His league and championship career at senior level for the Kerry county team spanned sixteen seasons from 1930 to 1945. 

Raised in Tralee, County Kerry, Landers was one of six children born to the former Catherine Roche and Garrett Landers. He was educated locally and first played competitive hurling and Gaelic football with the Rock Street club with whom he won three county hurling championship medals, while with the later renamed Austin Stacks club Landers won five county football championship medals.

Landers made his debut on the inter-county scene at the age of fifteen when he was selected for the Kerry junior team, winning All-Ireland medals in that grade in 1928 and 1930. By this stage he had joined the Kerry senior team, making his debut during the 1930-31 National League. Over the course of the next fifteen years, Landers won five All-Ireland medals, eight Munster medals and two National Football League medals. He played his last game for Kerry in July 1945. Landers's brothers, John Joe and Bill, also enjoyed All-Ireland success with Kerry.

After being chosen on the Munster inter-provincial team for the first time in 1931, Landers was an automatic choice on the starting fifteen until 1940. During that time he won one Railway Cup medal.

In retirement from playing Landers came to be regarded as one of Kerry's greatest players of all time. In 1985 he and his brother John Joe were jointly presented with the GAA All-Time All Star Award.

References

1910 births
1991 deaths
Austin Stacks Gaelic footballers
Austin Stacks hurlers
Dual players
Kerry inter-county Gaelic footballers
Munster inter-provincial Gaelic footballers